Agriculture is a significant sector in California's economy, producing nearly billion in revenue . There are more than 400 commodity crops grown across California, including a significant portion of all fruits, vegetables, and nuts for the United States. , there were 77,100 unique farms and ranches in the state, operating across  of land.

Because of its scale, and the naturally arid climate, the agricultural sector uses about 40 percent of California's water consumption. The agricultural sector is also connected to other negative environmental and health impacts, including being one of the principal sources of water pollution.

Value 

The table below shows the top 21 commodities, by dollar value, produced in California in 2017. Between 2016 and 2017, there were increases by more than 2% in total value for the following crops: almonds, dairy, grapes and cattle. The largest increase was seen in almond sales, which increased by 10.9% from 2016 to 2017, due to both increases in crop volume produced and the average market price for a pound of almonds. Dairy sales increased 8.2% from 2016 to 2017 due to an increase in the average price for milk, despite a slight decrease in total milk production. Cattle sales also increased by 2.7% from 2016 to 2017.

Specific crops

Almonds 

Almonds contribute a mean of 0.77 pounds N2O-N emissions per acre per year in Mediterranean agriculture systems.

Apple 
The Fuji variety is a recent import from Fujisaki, Aomori, Japan. Introduced in the 1980s, it quickly became the most produced apple here.

Apricot 
For a common pest see .

Avocados 
California farms produce 90% of all U.S.-grown avocados, with the great majority being of the Hass variety. Drought and heat can significantly reduce the harvest in some years. The Polyphagous Shothole Borer and the associated disease it carries have been a great concern here since their discovery on home avocado trees in LA County in 2012. Immediately eradication and quarantine efforts were instituted, and are continuing.

Barley 
Barley stripe rust was first found near Tehachapi in May 1915 on Hordeum murinum by Johnson and reported by Humphrey et al., 1924. Hungerford 1923 and Hungerford & Owens 1923 found the pathogen on cultivated barley in the central part of the state and also on H. murinum here. See also .

Berries 

See:
 
 , including:

Blueberry 

The  represents growers. UC IPM provides integrated pest management plans for blueberry (Vaccinium spp.).

Broccoli 

There was only trace wasteage.

For an invasive pest of this crop see the painted bug .

This isn't necessarily a waste product, as it can be useful as fumigant, see .

Caneberry 

For a common disease of erect and trailing caneberry (excluding raspberry), see .

Cannabis

Cherries 

The  is a state marketing order representing growers and intermediaries here. The USDA FAS's Market Access Program funds international advertising especially in Canada, South Korea, Japan, China, and Australia. The state produces the earliest crop in the year starting in mid-April. Lasting until early or mid-June every year, this is the second heaviest harvest after Washington.

Honey bees are essential to pollination for this crop. Cultivars grown here are harvested by hand with the stem (pedicel).

The center of the state produces almost all the entire crop and San Joaquin County, near Lodi is the highest producing county. Many of these are Bing.  newer Bing strains with better heat tolerance have recently been planted here as well as counties further south.

Birds are common pests in cherry orchards.

Cherry cultivars 
Besides Bing, Brooks, Chelan, Coral, Rainier, and Tulare are also common.

Citrus 

The Mediterranean climate affords a lower rate of post-harvest disease than in some of the world's growing regions, similar to the Mediterranean itself, Australia, and most of South Africa. Postharvest problems that do occur tend to be mostly blue and green Penicillium spp. The Asian citrus psyllid was discovered in Southern California in 2008 and eradication and quarantine are now underway. DDT was formerly extensively used in this crop. (See .)

Cotton 
Gossypium spp. are extensively grown in the Imperial Valley. For a common pest see , and for a formerly severe pest here see .

California was an early adopter of Bt cotton, but at a low proportion of acreage.

Cucumbers 

From 19972000, the state's acreage varied between  bringing in $57,969,000$67,744,000.

Dairy

Dates 
Over 90% of US production is grown here, and most of that in the Coachella Valley. The distant second is Arizona. The harvest extends from the beginning of October to the middle of December.

The detection of the Red Palm Weevil (Rhynchophorus ferrugineus) in 2010 was very concerning to this valuable industry. See .

Figs 

Calimyrna is a common cultivar here.
 
Commodity figs here suffer from many insect pests here.

Fish and shellfish 
Relative to traditional farming, aquaculture is a small part of California's agricultural economy, generating only $175 million in 2014. Oysters, abalone, mussels, channel catfish, rainbow trout, and salmon are farmed commercially.

Grains 

Stripe rust is a continuous presence in the state. It is believed to have arrived in or before the 1770s because newspapers reported it starting then, and because there is a greater presence today of stripe than leaf or stem. See .

Grapes 

The 2020 table grape harvest was worth $2.12 billion while wine grapes brought in $1.7 billion, down 15.3% year-on-year. By weight this was 17% lower versus 2018. The next year, 2021 saw a much better yield. At an average of  they were paid $5,229,902,000 for the season.

Table production is most concentrated in three counties and somewhat in another two. Dollar value annually is $1,240 million in Kern, $682 in Tulare, $416 in Fresno, and in the top ten crops in Riverside and Madera. Consumption here and throughout the country is so high that the country remains a net importer despite this state's production, which reached  in the 2015 table harvest.

During dormancy, UC IPM recommends pruning. UC IPM publishes recommendations for this and other tasks during dormancy. Although thinning is often proven to improve wine qualities in many areas, some reviewers note a lack of benefit in thinning table grapes in this state's vineyards.

Deyett et al., 2020 finds Proteobacteria are the most common components of the microbiomes of this crop in this state's soils.

This crop has also played a large part in farm labor relations in the state. The Delano grape strike began among table grape workers before spreading to other industries. See .

Diseases of grape 
Disease information is provided by UC IPM.

Xylella fastidiosa was first discovered here in 1892 when Newton B. Pierce found Pierce's Disease in Los Angeles. Today it costs the state an estimated $100m per year. Because Vitis species native to the USA are tolerant to PD while the introduced European V. vinifera is very susceptible, Hewitt 1958 posited the Gulf Coastal Plain as the center of origin for the pathogen. However Nunney et al., 2010 demonstrates that the PD population of the USA is originally in Central America. Sisterson et al. 2020 finds that the southern San Joaquin Valley rarely has any X. fastidiosa prior to July. This suggests an entirely Glassy-Winged Sharpshooter vectored problem that has no (or very little) overwintering capacity. Consistent with this they also found that neonicotinoid applications tended to reduce PD incidence. See also ,  and for a treatment see .

Al Rwahnih et al., 2015 finds widespread Grapevine red blotch-associated virus (GRBaV) among raisin and table accessions of propagation material in California. The virus population here has an unusually low amount of genetic diversity. Although not known outside of North America, Al Rwahnih et al. does find this virus in California material originating outside North America. See .

UCD's FPS performs disease testing, vinestock identification testing, and supplies vinestock. FPS is one of the few National Clean Plant Network (NCPN) members holding vinestock for grapes in the country. See also .

The Canadian Food Inspection Agency has a good opinion of the state's phytosanitary certification system. As a result, CFIA's Plant Protection Division has approved California plant material for import.

Hoffman et al., 2011 surveys the Lodi AVA and finds that growers themselves (including those who also work as educators for other growers) are most central to the spread of management information. Those who are not themselves growers, but are full time educators, are less connected to the actual spread of information.

 (Uncinula necator) is another costly disease here. PM cost the industry $239 million in 2015, including losses and treatment costs, according to the estimate of Sambucci et al., 2019. For decades both the programs of USDA ARS and  have prioritized breeding for resistance to this disease.

Afflictions in grapevine around the world are often treated by removal and replanting, and this is often used in this state's industry. Regrowth is slow and replant disease often results from this. Westphal et al., 2002 finds that regrowth is hampered by the soil microbiome in California's soils. They apply a supplemental plant growth-promiting rhizobacteria (PGPR) treatment using arbuscular mycorrhizal fungi (AMF) and achieve quicker productivity recovery. This is one of the few studies in this technique and this area is understudied.

It is speculated that drought stress will increase fungal pathogen geographic range in the future around the world, but in this state this has already been observed.

Although famous for its devastation of strawberry gray mold affects table grape as well. Karabulut et al., 2003 finds it is an especially large part of post-harvest losses. They also describe common treatments and make recommendations See  and for a treatment see .

s are common in California. They are not caused by any one pathogen but are united by their similar symptomology in this part of the grape plant.

 diseases are common trunk diseases. In the southern parts of the state, a Botryosphaeria Dieback caused by Lasiodiplodia theobromae is almost always the only trunk disease in this crop.

It was first found here by English et al., 1962 a few years after its discovery elsewhere. Travadon et al., 2011 finds that E. lata is an entirely or almost entirely sexual population here but asexual reproduction may be a rare occurrence. E. lata populations in California are shared between three hosts, this one, apricot and willow (Salix spp.). Travadon et al. 2015 finds high gene flow and an absence of differentiating alleles between populations on these hosts. (See also .) Additionally they find no differentiation by geography.

 (the California Dagger Nematode, or just Dagger Nematode) is a common disease here. Although first discovered in this state it has spread throughout the world's vineyards.

 (Measles, Spanish Measles, Black Measles) is a basidiomycete disease caused by several species of the Fomitiporia. It is a common cause of economic loss in the state. Vasquez 2007 assessed losses  for all afflictions called "Esca" in the state's vineyards.

 (GPGV) was imported in infected 'Touriga National' in 1981 and maintained at UCD, but no epidemic has ever been documented from that contamination. The California epidemic began decades later. Al Rwahnih 2018 documents an active epidemic in the Napa Valley AVA and finds wide variation in occurrence per variety, from 8.7–100%.

Pests of grape 

The arrival of the European Grapevine Moth (EGVM) in Napa County in 2009 brought together local, state and federal agricultural officials, scientists in California universities, and the wine, table and raisin industries. Together they brought about an eradication by 2015 and the effort was declared a success in August 2016. There is ongoing concern that it will invade again. Gutierrez et al., 2012 finds that climate change has increased its potential invasive range on this crop in the time since its eradication, and will continue to do so. See .

Some vertebrate pests are also significant and UC IPM has management recommendations for them:
 Birds
 California Ground Squirrels (Otospermophilus beecheyi)
 Deer
 Pocket Gophers
 Rabbits
 Voles,
 Meadow Voles (Microtus drummondii)
 Meadow Mice (Microtus pennsylvanicus)

Delayed-dormancy in table grape varieties is February in the San Joaquin Valley and December to January in the Coachella Valley. UC IPM provides sampling techniques and management information for delayed-dormancy in table grape.

Budbreak is in March in the SJV and January to February in the Coachella Valley for common table varieties. UC IPM provides monitoring and treatment information for budbreak.

The rapid shoot growth phase is March to May in the San Joaquin Valley and February to May in the Coachella Valley. UC IPM recommends looking for spider mites and their natural enemies at this time. See .

UC IPM provides information on this and other pests of postharvest in table grape. They recommend some parasitoids for biological controll including Aphytis spp., Coccophagus spp., Encarsia spp., and Metaphycus luteolus.

Its anticipated damage to this crop was one of the major reasons for the passage of the LBAM Act of 2007. Despite expectations, this crop was not sufficiently impacted to justify the cost and controversy involved and the action is regarded as a failure. See .

The  (Harrisina metallica, syn. H. brillians) is a native pest of this crop. However A. misella was found in the 1990s to be a vector of a granulovirus of this pest. WGS is multivoline, trivoltine in the Central Valley and bivoltine on the coasts because temperatures are lower.

The  (Planococcus ficus) (Signoret (Homoptera: Pseudococcidae)) is a pest introduced in the early 1990s. It has spread quickly, impacting vine culture due to its phloem-feeding habit and because it is a vector of GLRaV. See also .

Thrips are a minor concern in wine and raisin but are significant pests in table varieties. This includes  (Drepanothrips reuteri) and Western Flower Thrips. The scarring that they cause defaces the appearance of table grapes. Grape Thrips in Salvador is especially problematic. See .

The Black Vine Weevil is mostly a pest of the Central Coast AVA but does rarely occur elsewhere. Treatment is possible but is usually not employed. See .

 (Argyrotaenia franciscana) is a native pest of this crop. It is endemic to this state and Oregon and Washington. UC IPM recommends restricting use of insecticides to control Orange Tortrix because many natural biological controls are present in the state.

 mealybugs are common pests in California's vineyards. They have become an increasing problem in the first half of the 2010s.

Phylloxera of Grape is a common aphid in California with multiple subpopulations derived from multiple foreign points of origin producing multiple invasions. The rootstock AxR#1 was formerly used due to its resistance but this has since collapsed and been replaced by other rootstocks. This phylloxera has since that time adapted to these various rootstocks. Corrie et al., 2002, Lin et al., 2006, Vorwerk & Forneck, 2006 develop microsatellite markers to track these multiple invasions and their adaptation.

Breeding of grape 
This state has the largest breeding program for table grape in the country. The next largest is at the University of Arkansas, and that was started in part from varieties developed here. Many widely used table varieties have been developed here, such as '' and 'Red Globe' from Harold Olmo at UCD, and the 'Flame Seedless' in 1973  and '' in 1994 by the USDA program in Fresno.

Although there is some resistance to Pierce's Disease in some Vitis vinifera varieties, none is immune  none will be productive and all will die. The Walker group at UC Davis has discovered several monogenic and polygenic PD resistances in several other Vitis spp.

 was a very popular rootstock here until the 1980s for its protection against grape phylloxera. Since the collapse of AxR#1's phylloxera resistance it has been replaced by a wide diversity of rootstocks. See also .

Fuller et al., 2014 finds  (Erysiphe necator) is so valuable in the state's AVAs and the technique of blending has so improved that PM-resistant type are becoming increasingly adopted, despite their history of consumer rejection due to off flavors. Ramming et al., 2011 find that in the San Joaquin Valley's table/E. necator and raisin/E. necator pathosystems almost all resistance is explained by Ren4. Fuller et al. 2014 also find that widespread adoption of such varieties would save growers as much as $48 million/year in California's  table, raisin and Central Coast Chardonnay vineyards alone.

Table and raisin production are associated with higher temperature areas of the state.

The  is located in Parlier. SJVASC produces varieties of table and raisin, including the Thomcord. Many of the state's table and raisin varieties have been produced using embryo rescue. The Ramming group in Parlier has been the source of many of these varieties since the 1980s. Their work includes incorporating wild North American V. arizonica and V. candicans into seedless raisin and table varieties.

UCD ceased releasing wine varieties in the 1980s. Then in 2019 they released 5 with high PD resistance to combat a problem which costs California grape growers over $100 million per year. This breeding program did not end with the release of these 5 and additional varieties continue to be released.

Intensive selective breeding has been ongoing in California since the 1950s for seedlessness in raisin and table. Much of the world's seedless varieties originate in this state's breeding efforts.

Aradhya et al., 2003 finds that California's accessions of germplasm originates from a single original gene pool. Aradhya finds that from this original gene pool there has been very active selective breeding primarily by cuttings.

Riaz et al., 2009 introgress PD resistance from into some of the state's susceptible varieties, and provide SSR markers for them. They introgressed 2 resistance alleles from V. arizonica that V. vinifera does not have. Riaz also provide markers for marker-assisted breeding with these alleles.

Bowers et al., 1999 develops some of the foundational microsatellite markers for breeding of California Pinot noirs and Cabernet Sauvignons.

This et al., 2004 produces a set of standard references for molecular breeding of varieties used here. This develops a standard of microsatellites for California's most common vinestock and rootstock varieties to aid identification in breeding programs.

Roger's Red is an ornamental grape selected from a wild vine near Healdsburg. Initially the discoverer – Raiche of the University of California Botanical Garden Native Plant Collection – designated it a color variant of the native V. californica. This was doubted by many nurseries however and Dangl et al., 2010 finds it is a hybrid of V. californica × V. vinifera cv. Alicante Bouschet.

Vignani et al. 1996 demonstrates that several cultivars long grown in California, and thought to be local innovations, are instead clones of several Italian varieties.

Petite Sirah is a popular variety in this state. Meredith et al., 1999 determines that almost all California Petite Sirah is genetically identical to Durif.

Table and raisin varieties used here come from a very narrow base. Genetic testing by Bourisquot et al., 1995 find that because they are almost always seedless they are frequently directly derived from Kishmish. Bourisquot also find that about 1/3 of the state's table and raisin varieties are not derived as their pedigrees state.

Genetic engineering of grape 
Up to around 2004 there was little understanding of what non-Vitis genes might provide immunity in grape, and would make good transgenes.  several candidate genes have been identified, several have been transferred, and some even produce immune factors that cross the graft union and so can be rootstock-only. (See .)

Treatments in grape 
Zakowski & Mace 2022 finds heavy use of fungicides for cosmetic reasons in the state's table grape industry. Pruning produces wounds which may admit pathogens into the trunk of the vine. Brown et al., 2021 finds that pyraclostrobin continues to have good efficacy against populations in California.

The  has been very successful since the early 2000s in monitoring and reducing the deadly disease and vector combination of PD and GWSS. It is located in southeast Kern County and involves both trapping and roguing of infected vines. The infestation in Kern has been managed well with a combination of symptomology, molecular surveillance and quantitative vector surveys. The campaign in Kern is a good model for the whole world's efforts against this threat, and for farmer funded voluntary management programs in general.

Prior to the 2000s there were no selective insecticides available for the most important pests of table grape. There was one – phosalone – which was banned in the state in 1988.

 was a vital chemical for this crop until 2019 especially for the Vine Mealybug. In 2019 the state Department of Pesticide Regulation (DPR) determined that it was necessary to withdraw virtually all chlorpyrifos registrations. Since then this has imposed a negative economic impact on the industry both due to higher costs for substitute treatments and due to control failures. See .

Cover crops are used to produce several different kinds of pest and weed control. Ground cover may enhance spider pest control of herbivorous insects. Costello & Daane 1998 finds that ground cover in table grape increases Trachelas pacificus abundance but decreases Hololena nedra. Over all they find that this method is of limited effectiveness in table vineyards. UC IPM recommends considering the impact of a pesticide application on natural enemies and honey bees before applying to table vineyards.

Crab shell chitosan reduces postharvest Gray Mold in table grape in Fresno county. Romanazzi et al., 2009 tests table stock from several varieties commonly grown around Fresno and an isolate from USDA ARS in Parlier, Fresno county. By dissolving the shell material in an acid they achieve control of postharvest Gray Mold by inducing a defense prior to the fungus's invasion. Pichyangkuraa & Chadchawanb 2015 believe this to be applicable to viticulture around the world.

Karabulut et al., 2003 finds that many postharvest pathogen isolates in California's vineyards are well controlled by a yeast, Metschnikowia fructicola, applied as a spray shortly before harvest.

Research in grape 
Table grape growers are charged an assessment statewide for research and treatment for PD and GWSS. For the fiscal year 2009–2010 this contributed $735,000, almost all coming from the southern San Joaquin Valley.

California's oenological research is highly respected around the world. This especially includes UC Davis's oenology programs.

Lettuce 
UCCE's Vegetable Research & Information Center provides comprehensive production advice for this crop.

Lettuce (Lactuca sativa) is commercially grown in the Central Valley, Central Coast, and deserts (the Imperial and Coachella valleys). It is one of the most labor-intensive crops in the state.

Aphids are a major problem for lettuce on the Central Coast.

The Beet Armyworm (BAW, Spodoptera exigua) is a polyphagous insect pest in this crop. There is wide geographic variation in timing with BAW, the San Joaquin Valley being vulnerable more in fall than spring, the Central Coast late summer, and lower desert valleys September and October in established crops and November and December in young plants. Discing as soon as possible after harvest and weed control to deny alternate hosts will help. Insecticides used include methoxyfenozide, Bacillus thuringiensis ssp. aizawai, SeNPV, chlorantraniliprole, spinosad, indoxacarb, emamectin benzoate, methomyl, ζ-cypermethrin, and permethrin. In organic, Bacillus thuringiensis and Entrust are used but note that any spinosad (including Entrust) will also harm the parasitoids.

Melons 
For a common pest see .

Nectarines 

Because nectarines are hairless peaches, for most information see .

Cultivars of nectarine 
UCANR recommends cultivars for the state:
 August Fire
 Zee Fire
 September Bright
 Diamond Bright
 Spring Bright
 Arctic Pride
 Arctic Snow
 August Red
 Diamond Ray
 Honey Blaze
 Honey Royale
 Ruby Diamond
 Summer Bright
 Summer Fire

Oak 
Oaks (genus Quercus) are cultivated for ornamental purposes and sometimes for acorns. For a devastating disease see .

Okra 
Okra is not produced in any significant amount here. Imperial County grows the largest number of acres in the state.

Oleander 
Oleander (Nerium spp.) suffers from various Xylella fastidiosa diseases here and there is some question as to whether and to what degree it shares inoculum with other crops including food crops. See .

Olives 
Newton Pierce surveyed olive culture in the state and throughout the country for the United States Department of Agriculture (USDA) in 1897.

Olives throughout the state suffer from the introduced Olive Fruit Fly here. Neofusicoccum mediterraneum, Diplodia mutila, and D. seriata cause significant disease here. More specific controls than currently available are needed for N. mediterraneum in highly susceptible cultivars, namely Sevillano and Gordal, and early harvest may be needed for D. seriata.

The Olive Oil Commission of California was founded in 2014 as an entity of the State of California. The commission was established as a result of a bill introduced by Lois Wolk. The primary goal is to improve the sales of olive oil grown in California.

Parsley 
Soil solarization is an alternative to soil treatment with methyl bromide. Stapleton et al., 2005 eliminate almost 100% of annual weeds in this crop with solarization alone. It completely fails against yellow nutsedge however.

Peaches 

California is the country's largest grower of peaches, producing about 70% of the total.

(Although the CFPA is a separate incorporation, it has always been operated by the CCPA's staff.) The overwhelming majority of the country's peaches are grown here,   for sales of $308.3 million. Since 1980 the total value of the harvest has been slightly increasing.

 cling deliveries for processing purposes have been on a downward trend for years.

UCD hosts one of the major breeding programs in the country. Most of the private breeding programs for peach in the country are found in California, with a significant amount of the public breeding also being performed here.

Pear 

Cultivation is heavily pesticide-dependent. In the 1970s that put growers on the "pesticide treadmill"  increasing control costs, resistance, and resurgence of previously controlled adversaries. In response the orchards, the UC system, and Sacramento have put together IPM plans which have increased control and decreased applications. Fire Blight is a major concern as it is throughout the continent. Fire Blight is so severe that it largely determines what areas may be commercially successful in pear and which may not, restricted to geographies inhospitable to epidemics. Even so, antibacterials are necessary. Experts believe that major efficacy loss or a regulatory ban would effectively end Bartlett cultivation here, 55% of the country's pears. See  and for the most common treatment, .

UCR provides integrated pest management best practices through UCANR. Pear Psylla is one of the most serious of these pests, both due to its speed of insecticide resistance evolution and because it vectors the pear decline phytoplasma. The Asian pears P. serotina and P. ussuriensis have been widely used as rootstocks but are not being used in new plantings because their severe vulnerability to the decline phytoplasma. The  (Pristiphora abbreviata, not to be confused with the Pear Slug Caliroa cerasi) is a minor pest here and usually easily controlled. UC IPM recommends Entrust and Success (two Spinosad formulations).

Pistachios 
Ferrisia gilli is an economically significant pest of pistachio here. F. gilli was formerly known as a California population of F. virgata, only being studied sufficiently to recognize that it is distinguishable from F. virgata due to its severe impact on pistachio and almond in this state. Jackrabbits, cottontails, and brush rabbits mostly damage pistachio trees when other food sources run out in winter or early spring. UC IPM recommends fencing, tree guards, baiting, shooting, repellents, and trapping.

Alternaria and Botryosphaeria dothidea are significant fungal diseases of pistachios here which often receive strobilurin, iprodione, azoxystrobin, and tebuconazole treatments.

Plums 

96% of the country's prunes and >70% of plums are grown here. Of that, >80% has come from the Sacramento Valley since the 1960s. For an invasive pest in the Bay Area, see .

Cultivars of plum 
UCANR recommends cultivars for the state:
 Howard Sun
 Santa Rosa
 Angeleno
 Friar
 Blackamber
 Flavor Fall
 Owen T
 Fortune
 Black Kat
 Black Splendor
 Black Diamond
 Black Beaut
 Flavorich
 Grand Rosa
 Simka
 Catalina
 Royal Diamond

Pome 
For a common disease see .

Pomegranates 
In pomegranate (Punica granatum), Black Heart (or "Heart Rot") is one of the most common diseases, as it is around the world. See .

For Prunus spp. see .

Raspberry 

Over 80% of US raspberries (Rubus spp.) are grown here. The country's consumption has increased eightfold between 2001 and 2021. This crop is 15% of the state's fresh berry sales. Acreage (number of hectares) before 2014 is unknown, but in that year  produced  selling for $434 million, then the next year  produced  worth $547 million, and in 2016  produced  for $358 million, worth more than the peach harvest and four times the pear harvest. The state has the opportunity to capture much of the market because  most of the raspberry (55%), blackberry, and blueberry market in the country is imported, with Mexico supplying 98% of imported raspberry and they have probably reached their limit. California produces the most fresh market red raspberries, while Washington is highest for the processed market. Because the recent expansion has taken acres that had been pasture, pest and disease pressure is very small  making organic an easy option. The available acreage for that kind of conversion may have reached the limit  however. Pre-transplant soil fumigation is necessary in conventional, making organic inviable if this kind of new(-to caneberry) acreage is not available. Driscoll's is the marketer of 90% of raspberries from California and Mexico sold into the US.

Leaf Spot is not common here. See , or for an easily confused disease which does not affect this crop, see .

Rice 

By 2006, California produced the second-largest rice crop in the United States, after Arkansas, with production concentrated in six counties north of Sacramento.

California's production is dominated by short- and medium-grain japonica varieties, including cultivars developed for the local climate such as Calrose, which makes up as much as 85% of the state's crop.

Small grains 
UC ANR (University of California Division of Agriculture and Natural Resources) has a program specifically for small grains. UCANR provides pest management information and cultivation practices and organizes farmer education events. UC-IPM also produces publications specifically for pest management in these crops.

Although small grains are not a large part of the overall agricultural productivity of the state, they are important enough in particular locations for ANR to have Extension workers especially for San Diego County, Kings County, San Joaquin County, Siskiyou County, Lassen County, Sutter- and Yuba- and Colusa- Counties, Davis, Kern County, Woodland, Yolo County, Tulelake, Siskiyou, Tulare, and Sonoma.

 is an industry initiative which also cooperates extensively with the University of California breeding programs. GSG connects future farmers, present farmers, seed suppliers, processors, and consumers.

See  for a weed of these crops.

Stonefruit 

Stonefruits are crops of the genus Prunus.

Diseases of stonefruit 

UCD's FPS performs disease testing (especially for viruses), variety identification testing, and supplies budstock and rootstock. See also .

Breeding of stonefruit 
So much of North America's stonefruit is grown here that almost all available propagation material is adapted to California specifically. Few accessions are available which are appropriate anywhere else. Even so, these are really made for the previous situation in the state, in which lower densities prevailed and dwarfing rootstocks were not used. With increasing mechanization there is a need for such rootstocks.

Pests of stonefruit 
For a leaf gall pest see .

Strawberries 

Strawberries (Fragaria × ananassa) in the United States are almost entirely grown in California  86% of fresh and 98% of frozen in 2017  with Florida a distant second. The 2017 harvest was  worth $3,100,215,000. Of that 30.0% was from Monterey, 28.6% from Ventura, 20.0% from Santa Barbara, 10.0% from San Luis Obispo, and 9.2% from Santa Cruz. The Watsonville/Salinas strawberry zone in Santa Cruz/Monterey, and the Oxnard zone in Ventura, contribute heavily to those concentrations.

The average price being , the 2005 season's harvest sold for $1,122,834,000.

The California Strawberry Commission is the Agriculture Department body which advocates for strawberry growers. The CSC provides information for both growers and consumers. Some towns have annual strawberry festivals, see . The Driscoll's company began with strawberries here and still grows and sells here, and they have since expanded to other states, countries, and types of berries.

Labor costs have increased drastically since 2018 especially in this crop, see .

Timber 
Almost 40% of the state is forest, . Of that  was maintained as timberland  of which about 77% is softwood. Most lumber grown here is used here in the construction industry and some additional lumber is imported from nearby states and provinces.

Tomatoes

Fresh market tomatoes 
The Federal Risk Management Agency provides crop insurance for fresh market tomato here, through the regional office in Davis. 90% of FMT here comes from nine counties, San Joaquin County, Merced,  Fresno, San Diego, Kern, Stanislaus, Kings, Tulare, and Sacramento.

 widely incorporate Meloidogyne resistance.

Walnuts 

California walnuts account for nearly all the walnuts grown in the United States. In 2017, walnut production was the seventh most valuable agricultural commodity in California, valued at $1.59 billion in cash receipts.

Walnuts contribute a mean of  emissions per year in Mediterranean agriculture systems.

Wheat 
Wheat stripe rust is believed to have been present at or before the 1770s due to newspaper reports at the time, and due to the greater prevalence of stripe than leaf or stem. Hungerford (1923) and Hungerford & Owens (1923) found stripe on wheat here and almost all other western states.

As first speculated by Tollenaar & Houston 1967, in some years inoculum from the Sierra Nevadas initiates the state's epidemics. Wheat sown in the fall (autumn) in the valleys suffers from stripe rust carried from wild grasses in the mountains. This is not the only source however, as stripe will also overwinter in Sacramento Valley wheat cover. See .

Wine

Livestock

Fowl 
The domestic fowl industry suffers from avian malaria. Testing has been done since the Herman group made the first reports of P. relictum infection, in Herman 1951, Herman et al., 1954, and Reeves et al., 1954.

Honeybees 
Honeybees (Apis mellifera) in and around Riverside developed DDT resistance in the 1950s. Extensive use of DDT in citrus may have been responsible.

Regions

Central Valley 

The Central Valley of California is one of the world's most productive agricultural regions. More than 230 crops are grown there. On less than one percent of the total farmland in the United States, the Central Valley produces eight percent of the nation's agricultural output by value: US$43.5 billion in 2013. The top four counties in agricultural sales (2007 data) in the U.S. are in California's Central Valley: Fresno ($3.731 billion), Tulare ($3.335 billion), Kern ($3.204 billion), and Merced ($2.330 billion).

Its agricultural productivity relies on irrigation both from surface water diversions and from groundwater pumping (wells). About one-sixth of the irrigated land in the U.S. is in the Central Valley. Central Valley groundwater pollution is an ongoing environmental issue in the area.

There are 6,000 almond growers who produced more than 1.8 million tonnes in 2013, about 60 percent of the world's supply.

Parts of the Valley are quarantine  due to an ongoing pest eradication. See .

Salinas Valley 

The Salinas Valley, located within Monterey County, is one of the most productive agricultural regions in California. Monterey County grows over 50% of the national production for leaf lettuce, head lettuce, and celery. It also produces significant percentages of the country's broccoli, spinach, cauliflower, and strawberries. The area is also a significant producer of organic produce, with 68,868 acres in cultivation and annual sales of $412,347,000.

Organic farming 

California has more certified organic farms than any other state. In 2016, more than a million acres in the state were certified organic. CA grows 90% or more of the U.S. production of Organic almonds, artichokes, avocados, broccoli, cauliflower, celery, dates, figs, grapes, strawberries, lemons, lettuce, plums, and walnuts.

There are two primary laws that regulate organic production: at a federal level, the Organic Foods Production Act of 1990 and at a state level, the California Organic Food and Farming Act of 2016. Both laws lay out standards for production, processing, handling and retailing that must be followed in order to label a product as "organic". The USDA, California Organic Products Advisory Committee, and the California County Agricultural Commissioners monitor and ensure these standards are followed by administering enforcement actions for any violations.

Any agricultural operation selling more than $5,000 in products per year is required to acquire organic certification, if they seek to sell their products under the organic label. Multiple organizations are accredited to certify operations organic.

Environmental and natural resources

Water use 
The largest overall water users in California are the environment, agriculture and urban/ municipal uses. However, the exact proportion of total water usage for agriculture can vary widely between 'wet' and 'dry' years, where in wet years, agriculture is responsible for closer to 30% of total water consumption and in dry years, agriculture is responsible for closer to 60% of total water consumption.

Water for agriculture comes from two primary sources: surface water and groundwater. Surface waters include natural lakes, rivers, and streams, as well as large network of human-built reservoirs and a complex distribution system of aqueducts and canals that carry water from the location of the source to the agricultural users. Groundwater aquifers range in depth and accessibility across the state, and historically have been used to supplement surface water supplies in dry years.

California is one of the top five states in water use for livestock. Water withdrawals for livestock use in California were /day in 2010.

Saudi Arabian companies and individuals have bought land here and in Arizona to benefit from subsidized water. This has produced criticism because the hay grown is exported to Saudi Arabia.

Water quality 
Agricultural impacts on water quality concentrate around concerns of the following contaminants: nutrients, pesticides, salts, pollutants, sediment, pathogens, and heavy metals. These contaminants enter water bodies through above-ground surface runoff of rainwater or excess irrigation water, or percolating through the soil and leaching into groundwater. Water quality concerns affect most regions of the state and tend to be exacerbated during periods of drought.

At present, all irrigated agricultural operations in the State are required to participate in the Irrigated Lands Regulatory Program. The regulatory program began after the California Legislature passed Senate Bill 390 (SB390) in 1990, that eliminated a blanket waiver for agricultural operations to discharge wastewater without any specific environmental standards.

Water supply 
A major source for Southern California's water supply, both agricultural and urban, is the Colorado River from which an aqueduct has been built to transport the water from the river to Riverside. Colorado River irrigation is essential for agriculture to the Salton Sea Basin, which supports key agriculturally productive areas such as the Imperial Valley. Another aspect of the agricultural water supply in California is the transfer of water that takes place from northern to southern California. In northern California, the Shasta Dam contains the flow of the Sacramento River, preserving water for California's use, and pumping stations in the California Delta extract water transferring that water across the San Joaquin Valley and southward. A key component to the distribution of the water supply are the irrigation districts and water agencies who are responsible for delegating water as to meet the demand of those within the area as well as clarify and legal arbitration as to water rights.

The agency tasked with overseeing the state's water supply and any projects associated with the upkeep of the supply is the California Department of Water Resources (CDWR). As part of the 2019-2020 California Spending Plan, the CDWR received $2.336 billion with $833 million going towards projects overseen by the California Natural Resources Agency and $1.503 billion going towards the control board supervised by the California Environmental Protection Agency. One of the CDWR's major projects is the State Water Project (SWP) which distributes 34% of the water that flows through its various channels. The SWP also is one of the largest suppliers of hydroelectric power in the state.

The invasive quagga- and zebra-mussels reached the state in about 2006 and threaten the already limited supply of farm water. The mussels have continued to spread and present an ever-expanding threat to pipelines.

Air pollution 
In 2014, California agriculture soils contributed to 51% of statewide greenhouse gas emissions. California's Mediterranean climate supports irrigation events such as nitrification which encourage nitrous oxide production. Mean nitrous oxide emissions (the biggest contributor to ozone depletion of all the major agricultural greenhouse gases) have been reported to be "four times higher in irrigated compared to rain-fed systems". Another factor which frequently contributes to increased N2O emissions are warm soil temperatures (a common occurrence in California).

History

Pre-1850 
Peake & Fleure 1927 propose that many crop wild relatives and a climate with both a rainy season and a dry season are necessary for an area to become a center of agriculture. Before human arrival a wide variety of crop wild relatives (CWRs) were already found here  and although most of land has a monotonously desert or near-desert rain supply  some has a climate type called Mediterranean.

Since initial contact between Europeans and Indigenous American peoples, the topic of Native American agriculture has been debated. While agriculture in pre-contact California certainly did not fit into the Western definition of agriculture, the keen stewardship of California's natural ecosystem by Indigenous Californians to achieve the best possible output of resources is "agricultural," with California's ecosystems acting as a large, unbounded agricultural site. Because of this difference in ideology, agricultural practices in pre-contact California often took a different form than those of Europe.

Some California hunter-gatherer tribes, including the Owens Valley Paiute, developed irrigation. Native Californians were skilled at gathering materials from plants at all times of the year, allowing the consistent gathering of materials from any and all local plants. Depending on when various plants—including succulents, flowers, and trees—bloomed or became ripe, different aspects of the plant could be accessed or harvested by Native California peoples.

Native Californians also developed strategies when it came to competing with animals for resources. The Kashaya Pomo, for example, timed their harvest of dogwood to be before insects and worms would be able to access the inner parts of the plant. Indigenous Californians also developed strategies for acquiring black oak acorns directly from tree branches using a long pole, increasing harvest yields that would otherwise have been disturbed by animals.

Black oak acorn harvests were further increased by cultural burning, which stimulated acorn growth and increased biodiversity in the area. Cultural burning was commonly practiced by throughout California to maintain a healthy landscape that produced quality resources, as the Karuk, Yurok, Hupa peoples all regularly burned areas of bear grass and California hazelnut and to encourage the growth of stronger stems that could be used for basketry.

In the late 1700s, Franciscan missionaries established Spanish missions in California. Like earlier Spanish missions established in Baja California, these missions were surrounded by agricultural land, growing crops from Europe and the Americas, and raising animals originating from Europe. Indigenous workers from Baja California made up a large part of the initial labor force on California missions. In the early 1800s, this flow of laborers from Baja California had largely stopped, and the missions relied on converts from local tribes. By 1806, over 20,000 Mission Indians were "attached" to the California missions. As missions were expected to become largely self-sufficient, farming was a critically important Mission industry. 
George Vancouver visited Mission San Buenaventura in 1793 and noted the wide variety of crops grown: apples, pears, plums, figs, oranges, grapes, peaches, pomegranates, plantain, banana, coconut, sugar cane, indigo, various herbs, and prickly pear. 
Livestock was raised for meat, wool, leather, and tallow, and for cultivating the land. In 1832, at the height of their prosperity, the missions collectively owned over 150,000 cattle and over 120,000 sheep. They also raised horses, goats, and pigs.

While the Spanish were the most successful farmers active in California in the early 1800s, they were not the only ones. In 1812, the Russians established Fort Ross in what is now Sonoma County, California, and intended the fort in part as an agricultural supply point for other Russian activity on the west coast. Despite Russian plans for the colony, agriculture at Fort Ross had low yields, significantly lower than the California missions. Inefficient farming methods, labour shortages, coastal fog, and rodents all contributed to limit agriculture at the fort.

The Spanish (1784–1810) and Mexican (1819–1846) governments made a large number of land grants to private individuals from 1785 to 1846. These ranchos included land taken from the missions following government-imposed secularization in 1833, after which the missions' productivity declined significantly. The ranchos were focused on cattle, and hides and tallow were their main products. There was no market for large quantities of beef (before refrigeration and railroads) until the California Gold Rush.

1850–1900 
In 1848, before the Gold Rush, the population of CA was approximately 15,000, not counting Native Americans. By 1852, there were over 250,000 people in the state. and by 1870, 560,000 people. This rapid population growth drove an increase in importation of agricultural products, and, within a few years, a massive growth in in-state agriculture. In the first years of the gold rush, the state relied on agricultural imports arriving by ship, from Australia, Chile, and Hawaii. During these years, there was rapid growth in vegetable farming for local markets. This was followed by an expansion of grain farming. A shift in the economic dominance of grain farming over cattle raising was marked by the passage of the California "No-Fence Law" of 1874. This repealed the Trespass Act of 1850, which had required farmers to protect their planted fields from free-ranging cattle. The repeal of the Trespass Act required that ranchers fence stock in, rather than farmers fencing cattle out. The ranchers were faced with either the high expense of fencing large grazing tracts or selling their cattle at ruinous prices. By the 1890s, California was second in US wheat production, producing over one million tons of wheat per year, but monocrop wheat farming had depleted the soil in some areas resulting in reduced crops.

Irrigation was almost nonexistent in California in 1850, but by 1899, 12 percent of the state's improved farmland was irrigated.

Luther Burbank moved to Santa Rosa, California in 1875, and developed numerous commercially successful varieties of plants over the next 50 years.

1900–1950 
The 1902 Newlands Reclamation Act funded irrigation projects on arid lands in 20 states including California.

In 1905, the California legislature passed the University Farm Bill, which called for the establishment of a farm school for the University of California (at the time, Berkeley was the sole campus of the university). The commission took a year to select a site for the campus, a tiny town then known as Davisville. UC Davis opened its doors as the "University Farm" to 40 degree students (all male) from UC Berkeley in January 1909.

In 1919, the California Department of Food and Agriculture was established. The department covers state food safety, state protection from invasive species, and promoting the state's agricultural industry.

The Dust Bowl of the 1930s drove many people from the American prairie, and a significant number of these economic migrants relocated to California. Poor migrants from Oklahoma and nearby states were sometimes referred to as Okies, generally a pejorative term. 
In 1933, the state saw a number of agricultural labor strikes, with the largest actions against cotton growers. Cherry, grape, peach, pear, sugar beet, and tomato workers were also involved.

In 1942, the United States began the Bracero program. Lasting until 1964, this agreement established decent living conditions and a minimum wage for Mexican workers in the United States.

1950–2000 
In 1965, the Williamson Act became law, providing property tax relief to owners of California farmland and open-space land in exchange for agreement that the land will not be developed.

The 1960s and 1970s saw major farm worker strikes including the 1965 Delano grape strike and the 1970 Salad Bowl strike. In 1975, the California Agricultural Labor Relations Act of 1975 was enacted, establishing the right to collective bargaining for farmworkers in California, a first in U.S. history. Individuals with prominent roles in farm worker organizing in this period include Cesar Chavez, Dolores Huerta, Larry Itliong, and Philip Vera Cruz.

In the late 1980s the Ives flower ranch was the site of a notorious employment case. This ranch was in Ventura and involved Mixtec farm workers (from the Oaxaca state of southern Mexico) and illegal employment conditions. The ranch paid $1.5million in unpaid wages and fines.

Through 1995 there were 50,000 Mixtecs every year in California agriculture. They were about 70% of the 10,000 agricultural laborers in San Diego County, and had been spreading northwards to also work in Oxnard, Santa Maria and Madera County, and even into Oregon and Washington. They were usually not the only indigenous Mexican ethnic groups  Zapotecs and Mayans were also usually working the same jobs. In the 1990s it was common to arrive in Arizona first, work on an Arizonan farm, and then move here.

2001–present 
In the 2000s and 2010s, Californians voted for propositions which established new protections for farm animals. 2008 California Proposition 2 and 2018 California Proposition 12 both established minimum requirements for farming egg-laying hens, breeding pigs, and calves raised for veal. 
Few veal and pig factory farm operations exist in California, so these propositions mostly affect farmers who raise California's 15 million egg-laying hens.

Agricultural crime 
California nut crimes have involved the theft of millions of dollars of nuts (almonds, pistachios, cashews and pecans) in multiple incidents since 2013.

Water theft for agriculture has been an issue in times of drought, with the State assessing fines up to $1.5 Million.

Pests 
Despite its expansive geography, some pests are so severe, so polyphagous, and/or so wide-ranging as to be economically significant to the entire state.

The  (Amyelois transitella) first entered from Arizona in 1942 and quickly began attacking walnut, date palm, and fig – despite its common name it is only a minor pest of citrus. In the decades since it has become a notorious pest of almond, pistachio, and pomegranate and remains problematic for walnut and fig as well. First flight of NOW begins around April 17 and ends around May 29, and third flight is about August 8 to September 12. Second flight is not as much of a concern.

The  (Epiphyas postvittana, often abbreviated to LBAM) is a leafroller moth belonging to the lepidopteran family Tortricidae. The moth was confirmed to be present in California in 2007, and spraying programs in 2007–2008 lead to the Light brown apple moth controversy. Tavener et al., 2011 finds novaluron works well but only when carried by horticultural mineral oil. Hosts include strawberry.

 (Diaphorina citri) are a major invasive threat to citrus. (See .)

On the other hand, jackrabbits, cottontails, and brush rabbits certainly are a problem for pistachios (see ). The lagomorph biocontrol myxoma virus is indigenous here (that is, it is epidemiologically endemic) in native lagomorphs. This was first disclosed in Marshall & Regnery 1960 a&b. M & R found it in the tapeti (Sylvilagus brasiliensis) and the brush rabbit (Sylvilagus bachmani).

Olives throughout the state suffer from the introduced  (Bactrocera oleae) here. First detected outside its traditional Old World co-occurrence with the host tree in Los Angeles County in November 1998, it has since spread throughout California and into Baja and Sonora. OFF is native to the Mediterranean basin and appears in some of the earliest written documents of human history, and is now found throughout much of the world.

Particular strains of OFF are associated with particular varieties here. Burrack & Zalom 2008 find females have strong oviposition preferences for particular varieties and their offspring show better life history performance on those preferred varieties. The introduction here has spurred much parasitoid research, hoping to control them with biological controls. Daane et al., 2008, Sime et al., 2006, Sime et al., 2007, Yokohama et al., 2006, and Yokohama et al., 2008 all were undertaken to serve this state's need for parasitoids. Yokohama et al., 2008 achieves 60% control in cage trials using a Psyttalia cf. concolor. Daane et al., 2008 finds P. lounsburyi is especially specific to OFF over other possible hosts, and its selectivity makes it an attractive option. Daane et al. 2009 discloses an undescribed Pteromalus sp. nr. myopitae first found here. Overall there is much concern about offtarget impacts if these were to be released.

 are common crop pests here.  is one of the most common, especially for lettuce.

 here, especially in cherries. See also  for a repellent.

The  (GWSS, Homalodisca vitripennis, syn. H. coagulata) is a vector of Pierce's Disease and other Xylella fastidiosa diseases here. Probably present since the late 1980s, the GWSS was only confirmed here in 1994. GWSS was first detected in Solano in November 2021, and although  absent from adjascent Napa is considered a high risk for introduction. The staff of the  does inspections of all material entering the county to prevent that from happening. GWSS is such a problem in Fresno that there are permanent quarantine, monitoring, and eradication activities there.

Besides vectoring PD they are also themselves a sucking pest and Hewitt et al., 1949 found they will often additionally go through reproduction on the vines.

The  (Lobesia botrana, EGVM) was present from at least 2009 through 2014. A  block in Napa suffered a 100% crop loss in 2009 due to a burrowing worm. This was confirmed to be the EGVM by Gilligan et al., on September 30, 2009 (published in 2011). (It is native to southern Italy and may have arrived elsewhere in the state, possibly being detected as early as 2007 by Mastro et al., and published in 2010). Both USDA and CDFA impose quarantines if two moths are found within  of each other within one lifecycle span. At first the quarantine zone was  around the detection sites. In 2010, 40,000 traps revealed an expanded presence  in Fresno, Mendocino, Merced, Monterey, Napa, San Joaquin, Santa Clara, Santa Cruz, Solano, and Sonoma. The first detection in Sonoma was around Kenwood on March 29, 2010, then a total of 59 across the County that year. In 2011 only nine were detected on two sites in Sonoma, and despite the quarantine the pest spread to Nevada County in 2011. The quarantine was lifted in Fresno, Mendocino, Merced, and San Joaquin in February 2012, only one insect was found in Sonoma for the year, the quarantine was lifted in Nevada, Santa Clara, and Santa Cruz counties in December, and was greatly shrunk in Solano and Sonoma in the same month. No detections occurred in Sonoma in 2013. The quarantine was lifted in Solano in 2014 but one EGVM was found in Sonoma for the year and so the quarantine remained in Napa and Sonoma. The last detection being in June 2014 in Sonoma, all USDA and state quarantine and trapping activities ended with the declaration in August 2016 of a successful eradication. See also .

 (Prionoxystus robiniae),  (Blapstinus fuliginosus),  (Carpophilus hemipterus),  (Carpophilus freemani),  (Carpophilus mutilatus),  (Cotinis texana syn. C.mutabilis),
  (Aceria fici),  (Lepiosaphes conchiformis), and Navel orangeworm are among the most important pests of fig here.

 (Popillia japonica) has been repeatedly found here and repeatedly eradicated. Monitoring and eradication continue especially because of the wide host range of the grubs but also due to the grubs' and adults' destructiveness.

The  (Acalitus phloeocoptes (Nalepa)) was first confirmed here in Santa Clara County in February 2019, but may have been found in northern Marin in early 2014. Certainly since 2019 it has become widespread in the Bay Area,  reaching Contra Costa, Alameda, San Mateo, Santa Cruz, Sonoma, and north into Western Oregon. So far PBGM is known to be a problem on plum and pluot (see ) and not on other stonefruits, especially not almond, even almonds nearby to infested orchards.

The  (SLW, Bemisia tabaci strain B) was first noticed here in the fall of 1991. First appearing in the valleys of the state's deserts, it has caused about $500 million in agricultural losses here through 2019. Further economic effects include $774 million in lost sales, $112.5 million in lost personal income, and the loss of 12,540 jobs. SLW is intractable in the southern deserts, especially in Imperial, Palo Verde, Coachella, and the southern part of San Joaquin vallies. In the SJV this is worst on cotton.

Aleyrodes spiraeoides is a native whitefly. Hosts include strawberry.

Trialeurodes vaporariorum has recently invaded the Central Coast and Southern areas. Hosts include strawberry.

Trialeurodes packardi is a pest of strawberry whiteflies but less commonly than A. spiraeoides.

A , Bagrada hilaris was first detected here in 2008 in San Diego, Orange, Los Angeles, 2009 in Ventura, Riverside, and Imperial counties; 2010 in Kern, San Bernardino; no new discoveries here in 2011; 2012 in Santa Barbara & San Luis Obispo; 2013 in Monterey, Santa Cruz, San Benito, Fresno, Tulare, San Francisco; 2014 in Inyo, Kings, Merced, Stanislaus, Santa Clara, Alameda, San Mateo, and Yolo. From here it has become an invasive pest of Brassicas throughout the southwest US, neighboring Coahuila, and the Big Island of Hawaii. Much of the research on this pest in this part of the world has been performed by the Palumbo group at the University of Arizona.

A vacuum collector is often used for WTPB in strawberry, called the BugVac. (See also .)

The  (SWD, Drosophila suzukii) is a major insect pest of soft body fruits here, especially grape, strawberry, tomato, cherry, raspberry and other caneberries, peach and nectarine, fig, and blueberry.  is a parasitoid which has been successful as a biocontrol here.

Hosts include grape and strawberry.

Turelli et al., 1991 uses a genetically modified Wolbachia to suppress D. simulans to suppress its vectored diseases here. (This has become a widely known example of Wolbachia use, and has informed European decision making on vector control.)

The  (Estigmene acrea) is very common here, but usually causes no damage because they are a native pest with many natural enemies acting as biocontrols. SMC can be significant in strawberry, see .

The  (Bactrocera zonata Saunders) has been repeatedly introduced and quickly eradicated here, in 1984 and in 2006. Then on September 29 and/or 30, 2020, three PFF were found in Chowchilla, Madera County. This presents a tremendous hazard not only to the area but to the state, and indeed the entire country. Because the pest may spread from here to other countries, trading partners including the European Union and New Zealand are also concerned. They are considering restricting importation of fruits and vegetables from the state. As a result, the Secretary of CDFA, Karen Ross has declared a biosecurity emergency and eradication efforts using methyl eugenol lures are underway. Especially an immediate concern are California's $2.10b citrus-, $875m stonefruit-, and $1.19b tomato industries.

The  (Figeater Beetle, Cotinis mutabilis) is occasionally a pest of ripened fruit, including apricot, caneberry, fig, grape, peach, and plum. The larvae/grubs are harmless however.

As with every other infestation anywhere in the world, it has never been eradicated, and is still present at the original La Mesa site. In the time since there have been new infestations  mostly suspected to be independent introductions  in Canyon Lake, Riverside County in 2020, Rancho Santa Fe, San Diego County in 2021, Highland Park, Los Angeles County in 2021. The Formosan Termite is a pest of sugarcane, and for another host see , but it is most often a structural pest.

s (Diabrotica balteata, Acalymma vittatum, D. undecimpunctata) are common pests here. UC IPM provides recommended practices for apricot, see also .

 (Daktulosphaira vitifoliae) is a perennial aphid problem here. The industry suffered a wipeout in the 1980s due to overreliance on one, non-resistant rootstock. Islam et al., 2013 explains some of the genetic diversity of the population here by sexual reproduction, but their sampling leaves open other possibilities for the remainder. They also find two major subpopulations differentiated by rootstock association: AxR1 associated and those associated with all others.

It most likely arrived with in live palms which are commonly sold internationally. A tremendous effort was made to trap and eradicate, UCR's Center for Invasive Species Research recommended mostly insecticides, and quick destruction of any palms found to be infested. Pheromone attractant traps were very effective. The last sighting was on January 18, 2012. Three years later on January 20, 2015, USDA's APHIS declared the eradication successful. Its relative the South American palm weevil (R. palmarum) has killed increasing numbers of Canary Island date palms (Phoenix canariensis) and is expected to become a significant pest of dates in the future. For a common host see .

Insecticides are often used in their control and as a result some species have undergone resistance evolution. Mouches et al., 1986 finds one population achieved this via gene amplification of an esterase. See also .

Stern & Reynolds 1958 finds that from the beginning of the 1950s to the end of the decade severe parathion resistance had rapidly developed there.

The common  (Musca domestica) is economically significant in poultry production worldwide, including in California. From 1964 to 1969 Georghiou & Hawley 1972 finds rapid evolution of organophosphate resistance in a poultry facility in Moorpark. The most common permethrin kdr allele here is kdr-his, although kdr and super-kdr are also present. (This profile is also found in New Mexican, Floridian, North Carolinian, New York, and Montanan populations.)

The  (Pectinophora gossypiella) was devastating to cotton growers here and throughout the southwest. Chu et al., 1996 reports a management program in the Imperial Valley in which government imposed practices successfully reduced populations. This bollworm is now extirpated from the entire country including this state, thanks to the efforts of Osama El-Lissy and his collaborators. See also .

The  (Mexican fruit fly, Anastrepha ludens) has repeatedly invaded the southern part of the state. Sterile insect technique (SIT) has been used to great success to eradicate them every time, both here and in Texas. (See also .)

The  (Mediterranean fruit fly, Ceratitis capitata) has also been controlled with SIT both here and in Florida, although before 1980 both states used malathion baits. Eradication by SIT was accomplished with the help of the Nuclear Techniques in Food and Agriculture program, a joint effort of the United Nations Food and Agriculture Organization and the International Atomic Energy Agency (FAO-IAEA). (See also .) Studies of the Medfly invasion here show that there have been many almost-invasions at the state's airports and other ports, most of which have failed to establish including a small infestation in 1975 in Los Angeles which was eradicated using SIT. This has informed quarantine and invasion biology efforts and studies on the Medfly around the world.

Distinguishing them is nonetheless necessary, because they differ widely in insecticide resistance, with the PSM the worst. The PSM and 2SSM are also significant in peach here. Two-Spotted Spider Mite is also a major pest of strawberry, see Production of strawberries in California.

s (Aphis gossypii, Melon Aphid) afflict cotton and melon crops here. Insecticides are commonly used, and this has produced resistance and may also contaminate their honeydew. Insecticide contaminated honeydew may harm beneficial insects. See also .

For a host see .

The  (Chloridea virescens, Heliothis virescens) is common on cotton in the Imperial Valley. At least by 1985 C. virescens had developed permethrin resistance. Nicholson & Miller 1985 find severe metabolic resistance to permethrin in Imperial Valley populations. See also  and Imperial Valley.

 (Frankliniella occidentalis) is a major pest of horticulturals around the world. Here, it is especially known as a pest of peach and strawberry.

The  (Plutella xylostella) is a common insect pest here.  (Bacillus thuringiensis kurstaki) is a commonly used insectide for Diamondback Moth control in California. Shelton et al., 2000 finds a high degree of natural genetic variation in Btk resistance in the state's DM population.

The  (Eriophyes emarginatae) produces leaf galls on several Prunus here. See also .

Several  are present.  is found as an exotic pest here. Gloria-Soria et al., 2016 finds a significant amount of shared genetics between the population of the southern part of the state and New Mexico, Arizona, and Mexico.

 is an invasive crayfish across the Western US. It was first imported to a frog farm in San Diego County in 1932, and proved so successful as feed and food that descendants were sold around the state. They escaped and now are a widespread nuisance.

Lymantria dispar (spongy moth, gypsy moth) is an established pest here. Epanchin-Niell et al., 2012 find that annual surveillance costs can be easily reduced. Costs are reduced by 50% by targeting surveillance resources based on the difference in surveillance cost by location, and by the difference in establishment risk by location.

California is known to be free of Bactrocera tau (Walker). Very few jurisdictions – including this state, Florida, and New Zealand – are at such risk that a system of Steiner traps using methyl eugenol is employed to provide early warning of an invasion. Crops especially at risk include tomato, bell pepper, watermelon, other melons, cucumber and pumpkin.

 (Aonidiella aurantii) is an invasive pest here. It competitively displaced a prior invader  (A. citrina). Debach et al., 1978 finds that A. citrina is now extinct in this state due to the invasion of A. aurantii.

The  (Otiorhynchus sulcatus) is mostly found in the Central Coast AVA but does rarely occur elsewhere. Hosts include grape and strawberry. Creeping red fescue (Festuca rubra) is an alternate host.

 (Cribrate weevil) is common in the San Joaquin Valley. It is sometimes a problem in strawberry in the area.

Helicoverpa zea (syn. Heliothis zea) is common in several parts of the state including all strawberry growing areas. H. zea is especially troublesome in southern coastal California.

s occur natively here. Hosts include strawberry.

Scutigerella immaculata is an introduced pest restricted to high moisture soil. Hosts include strawberry.

Some slugs (Gastropoda spp.) are vegetable and fruit pests here. Several are introduced pests from Europe. Hosts include strawberry.

European Earwigs are most destructive from April to July here. Hosts include strawberry.

Eotetranychus lewisi is found in coastal areas including Oxnard and  Salinas. Hosts include strawberry.

Agrotis ipsilon is the most common cutworm here. Hosts include strawberry.

Pandemis pyrusana is present and eats the leaves of several crops. Hosts include strawberry.

Clepsis peritana is an ecologically important saprovore. Later in the season it is a pest of strawberry.

Myzus persicae is present. Hosts include strawberry.

Macrosiphum euphorbiae is much larger than other aphids in California. Populations here have two forms, a green and a red. Hosts include strawberry.

Weeds 

 (Horseweed, Conyza canadensis, Erigeron canadensis) is a common native weed here. Glyphosate-resistant marestail first appeared in the state in the Central Valley in 2005 and this resistance spread unusually rapidly through the southern Valley thereafter. Okada et al., 2013 finds several independent evolutionary events, and that these unrelated resistance alleles may have been passed along so quickly because C. canadensis can reproduce by selfing.  (Conyza bonariensis, Erigeron bonariensis) is one of the major  here. The Okada group also studies glyphosate-resistant Hairy Fleabane. (See also .)

Achmon et al., 2018 dramatically lowered seed bank viability, biomass, and density of all these weeds, and improved tomato yield using biosolarization using tomato and grape crop waste.

 (Delairea odorata) is an invasive weed originally from the Drakensberg Mountains in South Africa and Swaziland. It was first observed here in 1892 and has since spread to every coast of the state, and into one coastal county of Oregon.

The allozyme analysis of Bartsch & Ellstrand 1999 shows free gene flow between these two and cultivated beet. Wild beet is only significant in small grains in Imperial, where dicamba and 2,4-D are necessary. See also .

 (Amaranthus palmeri) was first discovered in San Diego County by Sereno Watson in 1876. It has since spread elsewhere, developed the worst multiresistance in the world, and become one of the most notorious crop weeds in the world. In California it is found in all but the northernmost counties.

 (radish (Raphanus sativus) × Jointed charlock (R. raphanistrum)) has replaced all of its ancestral populations in the state.

Pathogens

Xylella fastidiosa 
It has ever since remained a constant pathogen of many crops here, including grape, almond, citrus, and oleander.

Pierce's Disease

History of PD 
When European grapes were introduced to this area  Alta California  in the 1700s they died off repeatedly, primarily due to PD but also insect pests but the natives here had already been growing several native grape varieties, especially Vitis rotundifolia. In the opinion of Scortichini the combination of these two demonstrates PD's presence in the state from antiquity, that native grapes had coevolved with Xf, and that this is the reason for the repeated failures of viticulture here until mixed European/American varieties were tried. This unidentified problem known only as the  devastated  of vineyard around Los Angeles in the 1880s and Pierce was sent by the USDA to investigate. In 1882 Pierce was able to identify that most of the failure was due to the disease, and less to the insects. For Pierce's contributions to its study it was renamed Pierce's Disease in 1939 by the state Department of Agriculture.

Whatever the time of arrival in California and in North America, the current PD-causing Xff strains here show very recent divergence  in the mid-1900s. This is likely due to massive expansion  or even introduction  of the current Xff strains, replacing the pre-existing strains across the state as grape acreage expanded in the 1970s.

PD was assumed to be viral until the 1970s. The first isolation and identification of the bacterium is variously credited either to two groups simultaneously in 1973, Goheen et al., 1973 and Hopkins & Mollenhauer 1973, or only to Davis, Purcell, and Thomson 1978.

In 1997 the Blue-Green Sharpshooter (the primary PD vector) arrived here and the two have combined badly ever since. (See .) Only two years later, in 1999 together they inflicted over US$6 million in Southern California alone.

The Glassy-winged sharpshooter (GWSS) is an invasive agricultural pest which arrived in Southern California in the 1990s and has since invaded the central part of the state as well. (See .) It is an unusually effective vector of PD.

PD today 
The CDFA's  coordinates response and research in the state.

Alston et al., 2013 estimates that PD cost the state $92m in 2013 and over Tumber et al., 2014 estimates $104m annually in 2014. Burbank estimates the cost to be $100m annually by 2022.

GWSS remains a common vector of PD and as such is a severe drag on the entire continent's wine grape and table grape pricing and supply. In the Napa- and Sonoma- Valleys and other such costal AVAs PD mostly occurs in hotspots adjascent to small water flows. These areas are defined by small streams and ornamental irrigation. These are favorable habitat for the BGSS. Lin et al., 2005 provides SSRs for differentiating between the state's various strains infecting grape and other crops and Lin et al., 2013 for grape-infecting strains here and in Texas.

The BGSS is known to thrive in higher temperatures and PD epidemics are more severe in hotter years, and there is evidence that global warming is increasing BGSS transmission of PD here. Larger data sets are needed for stronger confirmation.

There are two major divisions here, a lineage from Bakersfield and Santa Barbara and another from Temecula and the north. Within the northern areas there is lower gene flow, probably due to the Mayacamas Mountains.

Zhang et al., 2011 compares a PD strain to EB92-1 and finds that they are surprisingly similar. EB92-1 is a biocontrol strain discovered by Hopkins in 1992 and published as Hopkins 2005. It is originally from elderberry (Sambucus spp.) and is highly persistent on grapevine but is asymptomatic. Zhang finds that the EB92-1 genome is a proper subset of the  genome, lacking 11 missing genes, 10 of which are predicted to be pathogenicity factors.

Vanhove et al., 2020 elucidates the current genetic situation of PD strains here, including population structure and their evolution.

Xf in stonefruit 
Xf is also significant in stonefruit here, causing Almond leaf scorch disease and other diseases. (See also .) Xf isolates CFBP8071 and M23 are common on almond here. Moralejo et al., 2019 shed some light on the European invasion of this pathogen. Their analysis shows these isolates have a 99.4% nucleotide identity with those on grape in the introduced range  and more generally, these isolates, a European cherry infection, and PD isolates from both areas have a high degree of relatedness. Chen et al., 2005 provides PCR primers, Lin et al., 2015 Simple Sequence Repeats (SSRs), and Chen et al., 2010 the first genome sequence for common almond-infecting strains here. Lin et al., 2005 provides SSRs for differentiating strains from almond from various other strains. While almond and plum develop leaf scorch (see also ), Ledbetter & Rogers 2009 find that peach does not.

Besides Pierce's Disease, the glassy-winged sharpshooter also vectors Xf among stonefruit and so its arrival threatens the world's almond supply (see  and ).

Xf of citrus 
Lin et al., 2005 provides Simple Sequence Repeats (SSRs) which distinguish California's  (CVC) strains from almond, oleander, and PD strains.

Xf of oleander 
Grebus et al., 1996 discovered the  syndrome. Lin et al., 2005 provides Simple Sequence Repeats (SSRs) which distinguish California's OBLS strains from almond, citrus, and PD strains. See also .

Other Xf infections 
Xf has many other hosts. Chitalpa tashkentensis is a common landscaping plant here and elsewhere in the southwest that is also a host. Randall et al., 2009 propose  for these strains but it remains unclear whether this is a distinct subspecies and whether it endures in the overall evolutionary course of Xf strains. Hernandez-Martinez et al., 2007 find  causes disease of Oleander, Jacaranda spp., daylily, and magnolia.

Raju 1983 finds Xf without symptoms on wild Carneocephala fulgida, Draeculacephala minerva, the Blue-Green Sharpshooter (BGSS, Graphocephala atropunctata, a vector), Helochara delta, Pagaronia tredecimpunctata, and Philaenus spumarius. Purcell & Saunders 1999 find infections in plants common to riparian zones here often are not motile in the host and spontaneously improve.

Botrytis cinerea 

Fungicides are used multiple times per seasons and as a result resistance to almost every mode of action is common. Cosseboom et al., 2019 finds the proportion of resistant isolates increased within a single season in conventional but not organic. This shows that evolution is driven by usage in this crop.

The analysis of Cosseboom et al., 2019 explains 93.8% of resistance by already-known alleles discovered by Banno et al., 2008, Ma et al., 2007, Grabke et al., 2013, Kretschmer et al., 2009, Dowling et al., 2017, Fernández-Ortuño et al., 2012, Amiri et al., 2014, and Yin et al., 2011, so very little is due to experimental error, unknown physiological effects, or undiscovered alleles.

Organic strawberry ranches experience very active genetic transfer with conventional strawberry and as a result they have high proportions of resistance. Cosseboom et al., 2019 finds that conventional fields undergo within-season resistance evolution, while organic does not, demonstrating that they are indeed not using the fungicides they claim to not use, and that genetic transfer is not so rapid as to change the situation in a field that quickly.

Ma & Michailides 2005 developed a microsatellite primed PCR (MP-PCR) for genetic diversity in this fungus, especially for populations in this state.  was first discovered in 2018 in Santa Maria and reported by Mansouripour & Holmes 2020. Bc was not previously known to produce a leaf spot phenotype in strawberry.

In table grape there is a limit of 0.5%  table grapes can only be shipped if an allotment contains 0.5% or less of Bc-infected berries. For one treatment option for grape, see .

Shao et al., 2021 find azoxystrobin resistance is very common in this population. They find it is much more common than in China where azoxystrobin is almost unknown.

B. cinerea is a common cause of postharvest losses in this industry. Due to the need for long shelf life in the California industry – because target markets include the whole continent – and the low moisture growing environments, Petrasch et al., 2021 find genomic selection for strawberry resistance is highly successful. In other environments and markets however this is not expected to be as simple.

Most B. cinerea inoculum is introduced via aeroplankton. Significant protection against this is afforded by polytunnels. Daugovish & Larson 2009 find 84%–90% greater yield and 62%–140% greater marketable yield resulting in   greater revenue due to polytunnels.

Though gray mold elsewhere may be caused by both B. cinerea and B. pseudocinerea in California B. pseudocinerea is unknown on strawberry. However it is found on blueberry in the San Joaquin Valley.

Other pathogens of grape 
 (caused by grapevine red blotch virus, GLRaV-3) costs the state $90 million annually.

Al Rwahnih et al., 2013 discovered Grapevine Red Blotch-associated Virus (GRBaV) here, a DNA virus of this crop. This is one of the few discoveries of a DNA virus of this crop.

 (grapevine leafroll-associated virus 3) is also economically significant.

Newton B. Pierce was working in the area a few decades before his discovery of Pierce's Disease, and over the 1860s he watched U.necator spread to the south. Frederic Bioletti called it the only serious fungal disease the industry suffered from, and so it has remained ever since. The first case of U. necator demethylation inhibitor resistance (DMI resistance) in was found in this state in 1980. This was only confirmed with Gubler et al., 1996's reanalysis of 1986 and 1990 samples however. Gubler finds that reduced rates prescribed by IPM are responsible for some of U. necators triadimefon-, myclobutanil-, and fenarimol resistances.

 (caused by Phomopsis viticola) is also a major trunk disease here. It is endemic to California.

Fusarium spp. 
Fusarium is a genus of many species which are ubiquitous around the world, including here.

 (Fusarium oxysporum f. sp. fragariae) had only been seen once before, in Queensland, in one sample of Winks & Williams in 1966, until appearing again here in 2006 and identified by Koike et al. 2009.  it has spread throughout the state. Henry et al., 2017 apply a Japanese PCR-based test of nuclear ribosomal intergenic spacer and elongation factor 1-α. They find such high similarity between the intended  Japanese  target populations and California populations that there are almost no false negatives. There are no false positives on other Fo types (i.e. those not pathogenic on strawberry). Although this suggests both populations have a common origin, that remains to be proven. The matching IGS and EF-1α sequences divide into three somatic compatibility groups. The vast majority fell into what they term SCG1, with a few of SCG2 and SCG3. SCG2 is always a false negative with this test which may indicate the entire group lacks the sequence in question. Although this proves to be a good test, a universally valid test may require finding a sequence specifically pertinent to virulence on the host and not other, incidental sequences. For genetic resistance see .

This is especially a disease affecting avocado growers, but also other crops in this state and in its other invasive range, in Israel. In fact although PSHB was noticed on a black locust here in 2003, the associated Fusarium was only detected in 2012 on home avocado trees in LA County. As all Euwallacea in both their native and invasive ranges, this insect prefers to infest hosts in this area in locations which are stressful due to their unnaturalness, such as urban ornamental plantings and orchards.

 (Fusarium oxysporum f. sp. lactucum) is common in the state.

Alternaria spp. 
Various Alternaria spp. are significant fungal diseases here and often receive strobilurin, iprodione, azoxystrobin, and tebuconazole treatments. The Ma & Michaelides group has done extensive work on fungicide resistance, including in these pathogens. They have characterized resistance alleles (and in some cases produced molecular diagnostics methologies) for strobilurin-resistant-, iprodione-resistant-, and azoxystrobin-resistant- isolates.

 has one of the widest host ranges of any fungal crop pathogen and so fungicides are commonly used. Almost all fruiting production of vulnerable crops must be fungicide-treated. Avenot, along with the Michailides group has found extensive boscalid resistance in a swathe from the center down into the central southern part of the state, especially Kern, Tulare, Fresno, and Madera. Although it is also commonly applied in Kings, no resistance is known there. (See .)

 is a common pomegranate disease worldwide. Michailides et al., 2008 finds the  can suffer at a rate of 10% or more here. (See also .)

 is common here. It is caused by various species of this genus and relatives including: Ulocladium atrum, A. alternata, rarely other Alternaria spp., Dendryphiella vinosa, and Curvularia spp. Epicoccum purpurascens causes Alternaria of breba only. (The first, "breba" crop is not eaten but must be removed because it harbors inoculum of all of these microbes for the second, real crop.) See also .

Candidatus Phytoplasma 
The  phytoplasma (Candidatus Phytoplasma pyri) was first found here in the Sacramento Valley in 1948.

Other pathogens 
 causes , a common disease here.

Natamycin is often used in strawberry. Adaskaveg & Hartin 1997 identify the C. acutatum strains most frequently responsible in peach and almond.

The Ma & Michaelides group has done extensive work on fungicide resistance in these microorganisms.

 is a significant fungal diseases here which often receives strobilurin, iprodione, azoxystrobin, and tebuconazole treatments. The Ma & Michaelides group has done extensive work on fungicide resistance, including in this pathogen. They have characterized resistance alleles of tebuconazole-resistant- isolates.

Figs commonly suffer from  here. Smut is caused by various Aspergillus spp. and relatives, including: Aspergillus niger, A. japonicus, A. carbonarius, A. flavus and A. parasiticus, Eurotium spp., A. tamarii, A. terreus, A. wentii, A. alliaceus, A. melleus, A. ochraceus, Emericella spp., A. carneus, A. fumigatus, A. sclerotiorum, and A. sydowii.

Moral et al., 2010 finds N. mediterraneum commonly causes a branch blight on several cultivars and  causes a branch canker. More specific controls than currently available are needed for N. mediterraneum in highly susceptible cultivars, and early harvest may be the only successful treatment for D. seriata. See .

 is present in the state.  and its vectors C. quinquefasciatus, C. stigmatosoma, and C. tarsalis are most commonly responsible. The Herman group made the first reports of infection and vector competence in various hosts, in Herman 1951, Herman et al., 1954, and Reeves et al., 1954-II. Zoologix is based in the state and is a major provider of testing services here and for the entire country, including for avian malaria.

 (Puccinia striiformis f. sp. tritici, Pst) is believed to have been a continuous presence in the state since at least the 1770s because newspapers reported it at the time on wheat and wild  grasses, and because stripe is more common today than leaf or stem rust. Barley, wheat, and various grasses are hosts here. Maccaferri et al. 2015 surveys the world's wheat and finds the Davis Pst populations are unusually heterogenous. That makes the Davis environment a useful experimental location for differentiating wheat genetic resistance.

Stromatinia cepivora (garlic white rot) was identified in the San Francisco area in the 1930s and Gilroy in the 1940s. It continues to be a problem for garlic growers in the state.

 (Mycosphaerella rubi, anamorph Septoria rubi) is common here. It is common on caneberry excluding raspberry, so erect and trailing blackberry, dewberry, olallieberry, and boysenberry. (See .) Treatment is simple, almost entirely relying on increased air circulation. Copper and lime sulfur work to some degree.

Although Leaf Spot of Raspberry is found here it is not common in California. (See .)

s (biovars of Verticillium dahliae) are found here as in any other ecozone. This includes . Unlike every other known Vert Wilt of any other crop, this syndrome sometimes lacks any or any noticeable vascular discoloration of the crown. In strawberry, methyl bromide has historically been vital to prevention, and with phase out, this disease is of increasing concern. (See .) In all cases some fumigation is necessary, and if fumigation is not possible then solarization and/or rotation are the only remaining options. (See .) Although drip fumigation (fumigation inline in the drip tape) is possible it does not produce the same results, especially failing to reach the shoulders of the beds. Nurseries universally use MB or MB + chloropicrin, while growers may use 1,3-D + chloropicrin, chloropicrin alone, metam sodium, or metam potassium. Note that MB+chloropicrin also provides an uncharacterized growth promoter effect in this crop.

 (SCV, Strawberry crinkle cytorhabdovirus) is common here. Much of the fundamental research into SCV has been performed by a lab at UC Berkeley, including research on mechanical transmission.

This disease is a problem of pomes, including pear.

 on strawberry have evolved strong resistance. Palmer & Holmes 2021 find resistance to the majority of the most commonly applied ingredients in the Oxnard populatiIon. For its effect on strawberry see powdery mildew of strawberry in California.

 of peach is primarily caused by Armillaria mellea and A. solidipes here. A. gallica and A. mexicana are not thought to be common here, but are common in Mexico. (See .)

 afflicts tomato here. See also .

 is a phytoplasma of apricot here. Uyemoto et al., 1991 found it on apricot in California. See .

 (Bremia lactucae) is common on lettuce here. The population in the country, and especially in this state, is unusual however: It is highly clonal. As a result, Brown et al., 2004 finds all isolates have the same metalaxyl resistance. See .

Kim et al., 2015 finds  isolates from citrus here have developed fludioxonil resistance, see . Thiabendazole (TBZ) is also commonly used in citrus here. Schmidt et al., 2006 find point mutations at codon 200 confering TBZ resistance are common in California.

 (Tilletia indica, syn. Neovossia indica) has spread from Asia to this continent, and since 1996 has been found in this country. It is present in areas of this state, and Arizona and Texas.

 (Spiroplasma kunkelii) affects corn (maize, Zea mays) here.

 (Phytophthora ramorum) is a widespread disease of oaks here and in Oregon, and is also found in Europe. It was first discovered in the 1990s on the Central Coast and was quickly found in Oregon as well. P. ramorum is of economic concern due to its infestation of Rubus and Vaccinium spp. All isolates here and throughout North America have been of the A2 mating type and genetic analysis suggests that although it was discovered here, the pathogen originated elsewhere. Although P.r. has also been found in England and Poland, Europe was not the source of the introduction here and analysis shows that it too was introduced from an unknown third region. The multi-locus microsatellite typing (MLMT) analysis of Mascheretti et al. 2008 connects P. ramorum populations in nurseries and the wild. Mascheretti also finds three genotypes that are common among isolates here and are therefore probably the founding genotypes. See .

 is a common disease of strawberry here. Weg 1997 shows that the resistance gene  is in a gene-for-gene relationship. Mathey 2013 shows that Rpf1 is responsible for most resistance in the Watsonville and Oxnard environments and provides a DNA test to predict performance.

Apple mosaic virus (ApMV), Arabis mosaic virus (ArMV) and Tomato ringspot virus (ToRSV, an RNA virus) are common pathogens here in strawberry.

Raspberry ringspot virus is a common pathogen in California. Diagnosis is performed by cross infection of one of the alternate hosts which are herbaceous.

Treatments 
California has a long history with pesticide science and the Pesticide Data Program's (PDP) assays  are derived in part from methods developed here. This state continues to be the heaviest user of the PDP.

The first known  anywhere in the world was reported by Melander 1914, in the San Jose Scale to lime sulfur. (See also .)

 was heavily used as a seed treatment here, applying almost  in 2000 but voluntarily reducing that to only  by 2004, before the federal EPA banned it for agricultural use 2006.

 are heavily used especially in fruit production. Adaskaveg et al., 2005 finds no compromise in effectiveness when substituting lower-toxicity fungicides for older, higher-toxicity ingredients. They find a boscalid + pyraclostrobin mixture, fenhexamid, fludioxonil, and pyrimethanil to be good substitutes for the more toxic dicloran, iprodione, and tebuconazole. Older fungicides also have generally experienced much slower resistance evolution than newer ingredients. Although it would be desirable to only apply when necessary, determining the actual presence of fungi is difficult and estimation and expertise are usually substituted for certainty. Mahafee et al. and Coastal Viticulture Consultants find trapping and PCR are cost effective for determining inoculum presence in grape in Napa due to the high density and productivity of the industry there, while Oregon's Willamette Valley's grape industry is too sparse to make it economical.

 was formerly an indispensable part of strawberry cultivation here, such that that Ansel Adams and Nancy Newhall selected "strawberry fumigation" as one of the great achievements of the University of California system to photograph for their centennial book. However, increasing legal restrictions have made alternatives financially more attractive, otherwise more attractive, or even just necessary. (Note also the unexplained growth promotion effect of MB+chloropicrin in strawberry.) MB was more effective in the finely-textured soils found in some parts of the state (see ).

 is one such other option. Stapleton et al., 2005 kill almost 100% of yellow sweetclover (Melilotus officinalis L. Lam.), chickweed (Stellaria spp.), annual bluegrass (Poa annua Linnaeus), shepherd's purse (Capsella bursa-pastoris Linnaeus Medikus), crabgrass (various Digitaria spp.), and spotted spurge (Euphorbia maculata Linnaeus Small) with this method in strawberry and parsley. Solarization completely fails against yellow nutsedge infesting the same crops however.

The s (including ) in the harvest residues of broccoli make them useful in the biofumigation of nematodes, although cultivars of Brassicaceae with higher concentrations would be desirable. Combining with solarization (biosolarization) does not improve the performance of this treatment however. (See also .)

(This treatment will also control weeds, other soilborne pathogens, and soil-dwelling insect pests.) Unfortunately 1,3-D is proving less effective than MB in the finely-textured soils in some parts of the state (see ).

UC IPM provides recommendations for integrated pest management, including specifically for strawberry.

For Strawberry Crown Rot, genetic resistance would be most helpful. Shaw et al., 2008 provides some markers to screen germplasm for such resistance. (See also .)

 is used as a prophylactic dip treatment to prevent Colletotrichum acutatum anthracnose. (See also .)

 is an SDHI (succinate dehydrogenase inhibitor fungicide, FRAC group 7) commonly used for fruit molds. It is considered to be at high risk for resistance here due to its frequent use often multiple applications per season.

The team performing this research, Cosseboom et al., 2019, also surprisingly found that this is such a problem that within-season evolution is significant, especially in the north and especially in fenhexamid, pyraclostrobin, and thiophanate-methyl. In fact, if there was any resistance at all it was most commonly triple resistance to these three. They suggest thiophanate-methyl should not be used at all. Adaskaveg & Gubler 2006 and Billard et al., 2012 find fenhexamid resistance carries a fitness cost however, so rotating it out for a time may restore its efficacy. Johnson et al., 1994 and Raposo et al., 1996 find suggestive evidence for the same in iprodione.

On the other hand, Saito et al., 2016 finds no fludioxonil resistance at all in Gray Mold isolates from blueberry here, contrasting with Washington which does have some resistance.

 is by far the most commonly used fungicide in strawberry, see also .

The  (DcACV) is a virus of the Asian citrus psyllid. It was first identified by Nouri et al., 2016 in isolates from this state. It is hoped that this can be weaponized as a bioinsecticide of ACP, a virus to be intentionally spread outside of the state to help control this insect.

 was formerly extensively used in citrus here. Honeybees developed DDT resistance in the 1950s, possibly for that reason. (See also .)

 is commonly used against Monilinia fructicola and M. laxa. The Ma & Michaelides group has done extensive work on benzimidazole-resistant- biotypes of both species.

These serve as natural biocontrols for organic lettuce growers here.

(See also .)

The moth  predates on the invasive weed Cape-ivy. (See .) In food preference tests, Mehelis et al. 2015 find that the moth is so selective about preferring Cape-ivy that it would serve well as a safe biocontrol here and in Oregon.  is a fungus which has been found on the same weed in its native range. It can be used as a biocontrol as well.

 is usable in organic. Ozone is often used here in organic grape  and sometimes by packers handling conventional  for post-harvest Gray Mold.

 has been commonly used for some bacterial diseases here since the 1950s. Overreliance in treatment of Fire Blight led to such severe  by 1970 that  was used instead, although it is less effective. Moller et al. 1981 found resistance had declined to ~5% at the original location and streptomycin usage resumed, but in 2006 pear again suffered from resistant epidemics in Sacramento County and most usage again ceased. Förster et al., 2015 finds efficacy has again returned everywhere but Sutter and San Joaquin. All other strains were in the range of moderate to low resistance. The SY/SJ strains carry a mutation in codon 43 of the gene , a chromosomal gene. rpsL codes for the protein S12 which is part of the 30S ribosomal subunit. This mutation reduces binding affinity for the antibacterial to the ribosome, permitting unimpaired protein synthesis. This mutation is much more effective than any on plasmids or in transposons.

s are used both to protect fields and storage facilities. (See also .) Serieys et al. 2014 finds that this has had a detrimental environmental side effect: Bobcats (Lynx rufus) suffered a severe population decline in rodenticide application areas at times when they also suffered an epizootic of notoedric mange (Notoedres cati).

 (SIT) has been used to great success against both the Mexfly and the Medfly.

The Morandin group has done extensive research on the use of hedgerows on farms in California. For a positive effect see . In the Central Valley they find hedgerows increase beneficial insect numbers.

Treatments to prevent desiccation are important because this is a major reason for postharvest losses in fruit, in vegetables and in mushroom in California's industry. Hyperspectral imaging is useful to noninvasive monitoring of postharvest condition.

Insurance 
As with the entire country there is USDA subsidized crop insurance for the state. The Risk Management Agency provides various insurance schemes and deadlines by County and by crop.

Research, testing, and propagation material 
 (FPS) is a part of UCD's College of Agriculture which serves the horticultural industries. FPS performs several services including testing for diseases (especially viral diseases), identifying varieties of unknown plant samples, and supplying cuttings (vegetative propagation material) from in situ individuals they maintain. They use a library of published Simple Sequence Repeats (SSRs) known to be relevant to the state's strawberry industry to identify those varieties specifically.  is an even more active, private molecular lab for the strawberry industry. CS&PL tests for clients here and around the world.

California's experiences with the Vine mealybug, Glassy-winged sharp-shooter, and Pierce's disease have informed the process of creating geographic models for the spread of pests and diseases and their management in viticulture around the world.

 Professor Juan Pablo Giraldo (UCR) has been making great progress since 2013 in nanomaterials applied to crops.

The University of California is one of the two institutions claiming ownership of the CRISPR/Cas9 patent. This technique has great promise for genetic improvement of agricultural organisms. What ever the outcome of the patent litigation, a license from UC or the Broad Institute or both may be required to produce such products in the future.

Labor 

The  program studies the state's farmworkers and provides information about them.

The union organizing campaign of César Chávez and its impact on the industry has become a well known chapter in American history. His movement was also joined by artists such as famed theater and film director Luis Valdéz. Ecofeminists have supported the United Farm Workers' strikes including Chávez's Grape boycott, especially for their positions on pesticides.

Despite the Immigration Reform and Control Act of 1986, Taylor & Thilmany 1992 found that the state's farmers did not reduce their hiring of illegal immigrants as farmworkers. In deed illegal immigration inflows increased in the 1990s.

In addition to advising producers, the Statewide Integrated Pest Management program (UC IPM) began training farmworkers in 1988.

By the late 1990s the large immigrant population had expanded the workforce, reduced wages and working time per worker. The reanalysis of Khan et al., 2004 finds that increased production of labor demanding crops increases agricultural labor demand, but does not necessarily have to because the same workers could have been hired to perform more hours. For many decades the Immigration and Naturalization Service (INS) and Customs and Border Protection (CBP) left farmworkers alone. INS and then CBP chose not to do any significant enforcement in agriculture, hospitality, or construction. Especially in the Northern Sacramento Valley and Southern San Joaquin Valley, farmworkers had risen to a high proportion of the population by 2013.

Even when immigration was unrestricted, strawberry growers felt in 2017 that labor supply was still too tight. Farmers here were solid supporters of candidate and then President Trump, but were quickly surprised by the rhetoric of the administration due to the labor situation in the industry. As late as 2017 the illegal workforce was still projected to grow. A Pew Research Center analysis by Passel & Cohn expected continued lax enforcement to produce a continued population boom, including among California's agricultural workers. During and after the escalated deportation raids the lack of normal labor opened opportunities for others. Many high school students with farmworker family members quit school to join them in the fields.

Some farmworkers here are not employed here all year but instead travel to other agricultural employment while California is in the off season.

Although the entire tomato harvest was performed by laborers until recently, machines for harvest have been developed. The harvest of processing tomatoes is now entirely done by machines. The fresh tomato market still must be supplied by laborers however. See . Just before the 2018 deportations began, in 2017 strawberry pickers earned ~$150/day or ~$18.75/hour.

The right personal protective equipment (PPE) is required for fumigant applicators and those working nearby. Practices and training and provided by the state Department of Pesticide Regulation.

, 9% of all unauthorized immigrants in California are employed in this industry.

Gillman et al., 2019 finds that on-farm interviews with workers can reduce food loss and waste. They find that interviews provide actionable information to change practices, reducing waste.

Enforcement of state laws and regulations regarding farm labor and pesticides is the responsibility of the s.

Harrison & Getz 2015 study organic fruit and vegetable workers here and find that working conditions generally improve with increasing farm size. Stockton et al., 2017's meta analysis shows workers were earning two-thirds of the average Californian due to a combination of low wages and underemployment.

Hundreds of thousands of members of native Mexican ethnics are estimated to live in the state as farmworkers.

The state Department of Industrial Relations (DIR) regulates and provides information for workers and employers. UCANR and UCCE also provide information for employers' business planning.

During 2021 field workers have been severely dissatisfied with working conditions. They complain of both suffering from the ongoing pandemic and from the financial impact of missing work.

The  is operated by the California Strawberry Growers' Fund.  it has awarded over $2 million for the schooling of strawberry pickers' children. The  have a similar program.

Billikopf has repeatedly (Billikopf 1999, Billikopf 2001) found that improved working conditions improve worker productivity of strawberry pickers.

Demand for workers in grape cultivation is greatest from late June to early November for the San Joaquin Valley, and mid-May to early July for the Coachella Valley.

The  is a program of the Indigenous Program of California Rural Legal Assistance which collects information on natives of Mexico employed in agriculture here.

References

External links 
 California Agricultural Statistics Review 2017-2018 from the California Department of Food and Agriculture